Maitland Historical Museum is a local history museum in Maitland, Florida, Orange County, Florida. It was founded in 1970 and is operated by the Maitland Historical Society. The museum has a collection of historical artifacts that date back to the late 19th century.

See also
List of museums in Florida
Maitland Telephone Museum

References

External links

https://artandhistory.org/maitland-historical-museum/

Museums in Orange County, Florida
Historical society museums in Florida
Maitland, Florida
Year of establishment missing